Melbourne Centre for Nanofabrication (MCN) is located in Clayton, Victoria, next to the Australian Synchrotron.
MCN is the Victorian node of the Australian National Fabrication Facility (ANFF) and is a collaborative initiative between federal and state governments, CSIRO, Monash University, The University of Melbourne, Swinburne University of Technology, La Trobe University, Deakin University and RMIT University. It is also the headquarters to the ANFF.

Purpose
MCN's ultimate purpose is to fill the gap in Australia for open access, multi-scale, multi-disciplinary nanofabrication infrastructure. 
The mission of MCN is to facilitate the integration of nanotechnology techniques into the Research and Development activities that support Australia's innovation and manufacturing economies.

Facility
MCN is based at a purpose-built facility, adjacent to the Australian Synchrotron. Approximately half of the central facility's research space consists of clean rooms (class 100 and 10,000) and the other half is occupied by biochemical laboratories.

Capabilities
 Biochemical Laboratory
 Characterization (materials science)
 Etching (microfabrication)
 nanolithography
 Microscopy Laboratory
 Packaging
 PC2 Lab
 PDMS Laboratory
 Polymer Electronics Laboratory
 Screening and Integration
 Thin Films

Notes

References
MCN Home page
MCN Publications
MCN Project Library
Accessing MCN
Contact MCN
Tech Fellow Program extended
Australian Nanotechnology Scientists to help US defense force research agencies in solving tough challenges
How to include MCN in your next ARC Grant
MCN visited by Professor Lord Alec Broers

External links
 Melbourne Centre for Nanofabrication
 Australian National Fabrication Facility Ltd

Nanotechnology institutions
Biotechnology organizations